P. spectabilis may refer to:

Pazinotus spectabilis, a sea snail species
Penstemon spectabilis, a flowering plant species
Phasmahyla spectabilis, a frog species
Pimelea spectabilis, a shrub species
Pitcairnia spectabilis, a flowering plant species
Polygrammodes spectabilis, a moth species

Synonyms
Pachyne spectabilis, a synonym of Phaius tancarvilleae, an orchid species
Phrynopus spectabilis, a synonym of Pleurodema marmoratum, a frog species
Poecilichthys spectabilis, a synonym of Etheostoma spectabile, the orangethroat darter, a fish species